Pogochaetia dmitrii is a moth in the family Gelechiidae. It was described by Oleksiy V. Bidzilya in 2005. It is found in the Altai Mountains in Central Asia.

References

Gnorimoschemini
Moths described in 2005